Gnathobleda is a genus of assassin bugs in the family Reduviidae. There are at least four described species in Gnathobleda.

Species
These four species belong to the genus Gnathobleda:
 Gnathobleda fraudulenta Stål, 1859
 Gnathobleda litigiosa Stål, 1859
 Gnathobleda toba Giacchi, 1970
 Gnathobleda violenta Stal

References

Further reading

 
 

Reduviidae
Articles created by Qbugbot